Testicular rupture is a rip or tear in the tunica albuginea resulting in extrusion of the testicular contents, including the seminiferous tubules. It is a rare complication of testicular trauma, and can result from blunt or penetrating trauma, although blunt trauma is more likely to cause rupture. 

Testicular rupture, typically resulting from trauma sustained during a motor vehicle crash or sports play, mainly affects those from the ages of 10–30. The main symptoms of testicular rupture are scrotal swelling and severe pain, which can make diagnosis difficult. Testicular rupture should be suspected whenever blunt trauma to the scrotum has been sustained. Treatment consists of surgical exploration with repair of the injury.


Treatment 
A potential testicular rupture is evaluated with ultrasound imaging. Testicular rupture is treated with surgery, but the procedure performed depends on the magnitude of the injury and the salvageability of the tissue. An orchiectomy, which is the removal of the affected testis, is done when the testis is not salvageable and leads to reduced semen quality and higher rates of endocrine dysfunction than repair of salvageable tissue.

Prognosis 
90% of ruptured testes are successfully repaired when treated surgically within 72 hours; the percentage of successful treatment drops to 45% after this period. Though not typically fatal, testicular rupture can cause hypogonadism, low self-esteem, and infertility. However, if left untreated the damaged tissue may become necrotic, which could lead to death.

References 

Testicle disorders
Men's health